Peromyscus is a genus of rodents. They are commonly referred to as deer mice or deermice, not to be confused with the chevrotain or "mouse deer". They are New World mice only distantly related to the common house and laboratory mouse, Mus musculus. From this relative, Peromyscus species are distinguished by relatively larger eyes, and also often two-tone coloring, with darker colors over the dorsum (back), and white abdominal and limb hair-coloring. In reference to the coloring, the word Peromyscus comes from Greek words meaning "booted mouse". They are also accomplished jumpers and runners by comparison to house mice, and their common name of "deer mouse" (coined in 1833) is in reference to this agility.

The most common species of deer mice in the continental United States are two closely related species, P. maniculatus and P. leucopus. In the United States, Peromyscus is the most populous mammalian genus overall, and has become notorious in the western United States as a carrier of hantaviruses.

Reservoir of human disease

Hantavirus 
The deer mouse came to the attention of the public when it was discovered to be the primary reservoir species for Sin Nombre hantavirus.

Lyme disease 
A recent study in British Columbia of 218 deer mice showed 30% (66) were seropositive for Borrelia burgdorferi, the agent of Lyme disease.

Other diseases 
Ehrlichiosis and babesiosis are also carried by the deer mouse.

Use as a laboratory animal 
While wild populations are sometimes studied, Peromyscus species are also easy to breed and keep in captivity, although they are more energetic and difficult to handle than the relatively more tame M. musculus. For certain studies, they are also favored over the laboratory mouse (M. musculus domestica) and the laboratory rat (Rattus norvegicus domestica).  Apart from their importance in studying infectious diseases, Peromyscus species are useful for studying phylogeography, speciation, chromosomes, genetics, ecology, population genetics, conservation and evolution in general.  They are also useful for researching repetitive-movement disorders. Their use in aging research is because Peromyscus spp., despite being of similar size to the standard laboratory mouse, have maximum lifespans of 5–7 years, compared to the 3-year maximum lifespan of ad libitum-fed laboratory strains or wild-caught M. musculus.

The Peromyscus Genetic Stock Center at the University of South Carolina was established by Professor Wallace Dawson in 1985 to raise animals of the peromyscine species for research and educational use. This institute maintains populations of several different species (including Peromyscus californicus, Peromyscus maniculatus, Peromyscus melanophrys, Peromyscus eremicus, and Peromyscus aztecus). A variety of mutations affecting their behavior, biochemistry, and the color of their coats is exhibited in these genetic lines.

Species
Peromyscus
californicus group
California deermouse – P. californicus
eremicus group
Cactus mouse – P. eremicus
Burt's deer mouse– P. caniceps
Dickey's deer mouse – P. dickeyi
Eva's desert mouse – P. eva
Northern Baja deer mouse– P. fraterculus
 Angel Island mouse – P. guardia – possibly extinct
P. g. guardia – last seen 1991
P. g. mejiae – extinct (1973)
P. g. harbisoni – extinct (1963)
P. guardia subsp. indet. from Estanque Island – extinct (1998)
San Lorenzo mouse – P. interparietalis
Mesquite mouse – P. merriami
Pemberton's deer mouse – P. pembertoni – extinct (1931)
False canyon mouse – P. pseudocrinitus
hooperi group
Hooper's mouse – P. hooperi
crinitus group
Canyon mouse – P. crinitus
maniculatus group
Eastern deer mouse − P. maniculatus
Yukon deer mouse – P. arcticus
Gambel's deer mouse – P. gambelii
Northwestern deer mouse – P. keeni
Southern deer mouse – P. labecula
Black-eared mouse – P. melanotis
†Giant island deer mouse – P. nesodytes – extinct
Oldfield mouse or beach mouse – P. polionotus
P. p. allophrys
P. p. ammobates
Pallid beach mouse P. p. decoloratus – extinct (1959)
P. p. leucocephalus
P. p. niveiventris
P. p. peninsularis
Anastasia Island beach mouse P. p. phasma
P. p. trissyllepsis
Santa Cruz mouse – P. sejugis
Slevin's mouse – P. slevini
Western deer mouse – P. sonoriensis
leucopus group
White-footed mouse– P. leucopus
Cotton mouse– P. gossypinus
Key Largo cotton mouse P. g. allapaticola
†Chadwick Beach cotton mouse P. g. restrictus – extinct (1938)
aztecus group
Aztec mouse – P. aztecus
Transvolcanic deer mouse – P. hylocetes
Oaxacan deer mouse – P. oaxacensis
Gleaning mouse – P. spicilegus
Winkelmann's mouse – P. winkelmanni
boylii group
Brush mouse – P. boylii
Orizaba deer mouse – P. beatae
Carleton's deer mouse – P. carletoni
Kilpatrick's deer mouse – P. kilpatricki
Nimble-footed mouse – P. levipes
Tres Marías Island mouse – P. madrensis
Chihuahuan mouse – P. polius
La Palma deer mouse – P. sagax
Schmidly's deer mouse – P. schmidlyi
Nayarit mouse – P. simulus
San Esteban Island mouse – P. stephani
truei group
Pinyon mouse – P. truei
Texas mouse – P. attwateri
Perote mouse - P. bullatus
Zacatecan deer mouse or southern rock mouse – P. difficilis
Osgood's mouse – P. gratus
Northern white-ankled mouse – P. laceianus
Northern rock mouse – P. nasutus
El Carrizo deer mouse – P. ochraventer
Southern white-ankled mouse – P. pectoralis
melanophrys group
Plateau mouse – P. melanophrys
Puebla deer mouse – P. mekisturus – possibly extinct
Tawny deer mouse – P. perfulvus
furvus group
Blackish deer mouse – P. furvus
Wide-rostrum deer mouse – P. latirostris
megalops group
Brown deer mouse – P. megalops
Zempoaltepec – P. melanocarpus - assignment to the species group tentative
Black-tailed mouse – P. melanurus
mexicanus group
Mexican deer mouse – P. mexicanus
Baker's deer mouse – P. bakeri
Carol Patton's deer mouse – P. carolpattonae
Gardner's deer mouse – P. gardneri
Big deer mouse – P. grandis
Guatemalan deer mouse – P. guatemalensis
Naked-eared deer mouse – P. gymnotis
Maya mouse – P. mayensis
Talamancan deer mouse – P. nudipes
Nicaraguan deer mouse – P. nicaraguae
Salvadoran deer mouse – P. salvadorensis
Stirton's deer mouse – P. stirtoni
Chimoxan deer mouse –  P. tropicalis
Yucatán deer mouse – P. yucatanicus
Chiapan deer mouse – P. zarhynchus

References

External links
 The song of the deer mouse
 Peromyscus Genetic Stock Center (University of South Carolina)
 Deer Mice Fact Sheet from the National Pest Management Association—with information on habits, habitat and health threats
 Hantavirus at the Washington State Department of Health
 Peromyscus photos

 
Mammals of Mexico
Mammals of the United States
Rodent genera
Rodents of North America
Taxa named by C. L. Gloger

nv:Naʼastsʼǫǫsí